Heavy Object is a Japanese light novel series, written by Kazuma Kamachi and illustrated by Ryō Nagi. An anime television series adaptation by J.C. Staff was announced at the Dengeki Bunko Fall Festival event on October 5, 2014, and aired from October 2, 2015 to March 26, 2016. The first opening theme is "One More Chance!!" by ALL OFF and the first ending theme is "Dear Brave" by Kano while the second opening theme is "Never Gave Up" by ALL OFF and the second ending theme is "Strength to Change" by Yuka Iguchi.


Episode list

References

Heavy Object